Skarydzew  is a village in the administrative district of Gmina Doruchów, within Ostrzeszów County, Greater Poland Voivodeship, in west-central Poland. Temperatures range from an average high of 75 °F in July to an average low of 23 °F in January.

References

Skarydzew